Robertson Glacier is a tributary glacier that flows south from Anare Mountains and enters Ebbe Glacier east of Springtail Bluff. It was mapped by the United States Geological Survey (USGS) from surveys and U.S. Navy aerial photography, 1960–63, and was named by the Advisory Committee on Antarctic Names (US-ACAN) for John W. Robertson, photographer's mate with U.S. Navy Squadron VX-6 at McMurdo Station, 1967–68 and 1968–69.

External links 

Glaciers of Pennell Coast